Hoda may refer to the following:

People
Hoda (given name)
Hoda (surname)

Other
Al-Hoda, Arabic language newspaper in New York City
Jamatia Hoda, Indian cultural institution
Undu Hoda Kondu Hoda, 1992 Indian Kannada film
Shahrak-e Alam ol Hoda, Iranian village
Shahrak-e Benat ol Hoda, Iranian village

See also
Nishi-Hōda Station, Japanese railway station
Today with Hoda & Jenna

Houda (given name)
Houda (surname)
Huda (disambiguation)